WNYQ (101.7 MHz) is a commercial FM radio station licensed to Hudson Falls, New York, and serving the Glens Falls section of the Adirondacks.  It is owned by Pamal Broadcasting and airs a classic hits radio format, which leans toward classic rock. WNYQ is mostly voice tracked although weekday morning drive is live with DJ John "Killer" Clark formerly an air personality at classic rock stations WPYX and WQBK-FM in nearby Albany.

WNYQ has an effective radiated power (ERP) of 4,600 watts.  The transmitter is off Route 149 in Lake George, New York.

History
The station signed on as WENU on October 19, 1983.  It switched its call sign to WQYQ in September 2006 and the following month, became WNYQ.

References

External links

NYQ
Radio stations established in 1983
1983 establishments in New York (state)
Classic hits radio stations in the United States
Pamal Broadcasting